The Special Operation Group (SOG) is an Indian elite paramilitary unit operating under the Odisha Police (OP). The force specializes in neutralizing terrorists, insurgents and extremists. They are trained to execute rapid action under any circumstance; these are highly trained for field craft and jungle warfare as well.

Mission
The Special Operation Group (SOG) was formed in August 2004, under the Home Department of the Government of Odisha with the main objective of neutralizing any terrorist, insurgent, extremist groups operating in Odisha.

Organisation

Headquarters
Odisha State Police Headquarters, Cuttack
Odisha Special Intelligence Wing (SIW), Bhubaneswar
The Special Operation Group, initially in 2004, had 543 active posts, but by 2009 it had grown to 1,370 personnel. In 2018, former Director General of Police (Odisha) Sanjeev Marik disclosed that the force consisted of 3000 active personnel.

Training
They receive training at SOG Training Centre in Chandaka, Bhubaneswar and also from the army base in Jabalpur.

Recruitment in the force isn't direct, the personnel are drawn from Civil Police, Odisha Special Armed Police Battalions and Indian Reserve (IR) Battalions. The unit also allows recruitment of operatives from the Indian Armed Forces, Central Para Military Forces and units of other Indian State Police Services. It works closely with the Special Intelligence Wing (SIW) of the Odisha Police.

Honours

See also
 Special Tactical Unit (Odisha Police)
 District Voluntary Force (Odisha Police)
 Counter Insurgency Force (West Bengal Police)
 Greyhounds (Police) (Andhra Pradesh Police)
 Naxalite–Maoist insurgency
 Operation Green Hunt

References

Non-military counterterrorist organizations
Non-military counterinsurgency organizations
Odisha Police
Counterterrorism in India
Specialist law enforcement agencies of India
2004 establishments in Orissa
Government agencies established in 2004